The Darwin Convention Centre is a convention centre located in Darwin, Northern Territory, Australia. Construction started on the convention centre in early 2006 and completed in June 2008, with the centre opening in July of that year. The convention centre is part of the $1.1 billion Darwin Waterfront Precinct project.

The centre has a total floor are of 22,900 square metres for conference, exhibition facilities for up to 4,000 delegates.

Features
Features of the centre include:
 A 1500 seated auditorium.
 Four Halls with an area of 4000 square metres with the capacity of 7,500 delegates.
 A Waterfront Room with the capacity of more than 1,000 delegates.

Facilities

Ground Floor
 Auditorium Room
 Four Halls
 Four meeting rooms
 Registration
 Cafe

Floor 1
 Auditorium Room

Floor 2
 Four Waterfront Rooms

References

External links

Convention Construction

Convention centres in Australia
Tourist attractions in Darwin, Northern Territory
Buildings and structures in Darwin, Northern Territory
Infrastructure completed in 2008
2008 establishments in Australia
Event venues established in 2008